Bernardo Ruiz is a Mexican and American documentary filmmaker. He directed and produced the documentary Reportero about attacks on the press in Mexico. He is the founder of Quiet Pictures.

Awards and nominations
 2017 - News & Documentary Emmy Award nomination for Outstanding Business and Economic Documentary, Kingdom of Shadows
2014 - News & Documentary Emmy Award nomination for Outstanding Informational Programming – Long Form, Reportero 
 2012 - Cinema Tropical Awards - Nominee Best U.S. Latino Documentary, Reportero
 2008 - ALMA Award for Outstanding Made for TV Documentary, American Experience: Roberto Clemente
 2003 - Morelia International Film Festival - Best Short Documentary

Filmography
 2020 (Director), The Infinite Race. Part of ESPN's 30 for 30 series.
2020 (Director), "Latino Vote: Dispatches from the Battleground" 
2018 (Director/Producer), "Harvest Season"
 2015 (Director/Producer), "Kingdom of Shadows" (Spanish title: "Lo que reina en las sombras")
 2013 (Executive Producer, Series Director), The Graduates/Los Graduados
 2012 (Director/Producer), Reportero
 2008 (Director/Producer), American Experience: Roberto Clemente
 2003 (Co-Producer), The Sixth Section

References

External links
 Quiet Pictures
 Interview with Bernardo Ruiz
 
 Reportero on POV (TV series)
 

Year of birth missing (living people)
Living people
American filmmakers